The 2007 UC Davis football team represented the University of California, Davis as a member of the Great West Conference (GWC) during the 2007 NCAA Division I FCS football season. Led by 15th-year head coach Bob Biggs, UC Davis compiled an overall record of 5–6 with a mark of 1–3 in conference play, placing fourth in the GWC. The losing record ended a streak of 37 consecutive winning season for the program. The team was outscored by its opponents 349 to 306 for the season. The Aggies played home games at the newly-opened Aggie Stadium in Davis, California.

Schedule

UC Davis players in the NFL
No UC Davis Aggies players were selected in the 2008 NFL Draft.

The following finished their UC Davis career in 2007, were not drafted, but played in the NFL:

References

UC Davis
UC Davis Aggies football seasons
UC Davis Aggies football